Austrian Air Services, officially licensed as Österreichischer Inlands- und Regionalflugdienst GesmbH (German for Austrian Domestic and Regional Flight Service), was an airline headquartered in Austria, operating domestic and regional flights on behalf of Austrian Airlines.

History
Austrian Air Services was founded on 4 February 1980, with the first revenue flight on 1 April of that year. The company originally was owned by Austrian Airlines (26 percent) and the airport authorities of the five largest airports of the country (see below) to 14.8 percent each, but later became a wholly owned subsidiary of Austrian Airlines. In 1993, 86 people worked for the airline. On 2 May 1994, Austrian Air Services was disestablished.

Destinations
Austrian Air Services operated scheduled flights to the following domestic destinations:

Graz - Graz Airport
Linz - Linz Airport
Klagenfurt - Klagenfurt Airport
Salzburg - Salzburg Airport
Vienna - Vienna International Airport (base)

Fleet
The initial fleet of Austrian Air Services consisted of two Fairchild Swearingen Metroliner aircraft. From 1988 onwards, the fleet was expanded with larger Fokker 50 airliners. When the airline was disestablished in 1994, its then eight aircraft of that type were acquired by Tyrolean Airways.

Incidents
On 17 September 1984, an Austrian Air Services Fairchild Swearingen Metroliner (registered OE-LSA) was damaged beyond repair in a belly landing at Vienna International Airport, following the failure to deploy the landing gear. There were no reports of any notable injuries to the eight passengers and two pilots on board.

References

Defunct airlines of Austria
Airlines established in 1980
Airlines disestablished in 1994